The Amstrad PCW series is a range of personal computers produced by British company Amstrad from 1985 to 1998, and also sold under licence in Europe as the "Joyce" by the German electronics company Schneider in the early years of the series' life. The PCW, short for Personal Computer Word-processor, was targeted at the word processing and home office markets. When it was launched the cost of a PCW system was under 25% of the cost of almost all IBM-compatible PC systems in the UK, and as a result the machine was very popular both in the UK and in Europe, persuading many technophobes to venture into using computers. However the last two models, introduced in the mid-1990s, were commercial failures, being squeezed out of the market by the falling prices, greater capabilities and wider range of software for IBM-compatible PCs.

In all models, including the last, the monitor's casing included the CPU, RAM, floppy disk drives and power supply for all of the systems' components. All except the last included a printer in the price. Early models used 3-inch floppy disks, while those sold from 1991 onwards used 3½-inch floppies, which became the industry standard around the time the PCW series was launched. A variety of inexpensive products and services were launched to copy 3-inch floppies to the 3½-inch format so that data could be transferred to other machines.

All models except the last included the Locoscript word processing program, the CP/M Plus operating system, Mallard BASIC and the Logo programming language at no extra cost. A wide range of other CP/M office software and several games  became available, some commercially produced and some free. Although Amstrad supplied all but the last model as text based systems, graphical user interface peripherals and the supporting software also became available. The last model had its own unique GUI operating system and set of office applications, which were included in the price. However, none of the software for previous PCW models could run on this system.

Development and launch
In 1984, Tandy Corporation executive Steve Leininger, designer of the TRS-80 Model I, admitted that "as an industry we haven't found any compelling reason to buy a computer for the home" other than for word processing. Amstrad's founder Alan Sugar realised that most computers in the United Kingdom were used for word processing at home, and  allegedly sketched an outline design for a low cost replacement for typewriters during a flight to the Far East. This design featured a single "box" containing all the components, including a portrait-oriented display, which would be more convenient for displaying documents than the usual landscape orientation. However the portrait display was quickly eliminated because it would have been too expensive, and the printer also became a separate unit. To reduce the cost of the printer, Amstrad commissioned an ASIC (custom circuit) from MEJ Electronics, which had developed the hardware for Amstrad's earlier CPC-464. Two other veterans of the CPC-464's creation played important roles, with Roland Perry managing the PCW project and Locomotive Software producing the Locoscript word processing program and other software. The CP/M operating system was added at the last minute.  During development the PCW 8256 / 8512 project was code-named "Joyce" after Sugar's secretary.

For the launch the product name "Zircon" was jointly suggested by MEJ Electronics and Locomotive Software, as both companies had been spun off from Data Recall, which had produced a word processing system called "Diamond" in the 1970s. Sugar, preferring a more descriptive name, suggested "WPC" standing for "Word Processing Computer", but Perry pointed out that this invited jokes about Women Police Constables. Sugar reshuffled the initials and the product was launched as the "Personal Computer Word-processor", abbreviated to "PCW". The advertising campaign featured trucks unloading typewriters to form huge scrap heaps, with the slogan "It's more than a word processor for less than most typewriters". In Britain the system was initially sold exclusively through Dixons, whose chairman shared Sugar's dream that computers would cease to be exclusive products for the technologically adept and would become consumer products.

Impact on the computer market
In 1986, John Whitehead described the Amstrad PCW as "the bargain of the decade", and technology writer Gordon Laing said in 2007, "It represented fantastic value at a time when an IBM compatible or a Mac would cost a comparative fortune." At its United Kingdom  launch in September 1985, the basic PCW model was priced at £399 plus value added tax, which included a printer, word processor program, the CP/M operating system and associated utilities, and a BASIC interpreter. Software vendors quickly made a wide range of additional applications available, including accounting, spreadsheet and database programs, so that the system was able to support most of the requirements of a home or small business.

Shortly afterwards the Tandy 1000 was introduced in the UK with the MS-DOS operating system and a similar suite of business applications and became the only other IBM-compatible personal computer system available for less than £1,000 in Britain.  At the time the cheapest complete systems from Apricot Computers cost under £2,000 and the cheapest IBM PC system cost £2,400. Although competitors' systems generally had more sophisticated features, including colour monitors, Whitehead thought the Amstrad PCW offered the best value for money.

In the US the PCW was launched at a price of $799, and its competitors were initially the Magnavox VideoWriter and Smith Corona PWP, two word-processing systems whose prices also included a screen, keyboard and printer. The magazine Popular Science thought that the PCW could not compete as a general-purpose computer, because its use of non-standard 3-inch floppy disk drives and the rather old CP/M operating system would restrict the range of software available from expanding beyond the spreadsheet, typing tutor and cheque book balancing programs already on sale. However, the magazine predicted that the PCW's large screen and easy-to-use word processing software would make it a formidable competitor for dedicated word processors in the home and business markets. The system was sold in the US via major stores, business equipment shops and electronics retailers.

The PCW redefined the idea of "best value" in computers by concentrating on reducing the price, which totally disrupted the personal computer market. The low price encouraged home users to trade up from simpler systems like the Sinclair Spectrum, whose sales had passed their peak. According to Personal Computer World, the PCW "got the technophobes using computers". In the first two years over 700,000 PCWs were sold, gaining Amstrad 60% of the UK home computer market, and 20% of the European personal computer market, second only to IBM's 33.3% share. Having gained credibility as computer supplier, Amstrad launched IBM-compatible PCs, once again focussing on low prices, with its PC1512 surpassing the IBM PC on performance and beating even the Taiwanese clones on price. Amstrad became the dominant British personal computer company, buying all the designs, marketing rights and product stocks of Sinclair Research Ltd's computer division in April 1986, while Apricot later sold its manufacturing assets to Mitsubishi and became a software company.

In the PCW's heyday the magazines 8000 Plus (later called PCW Plus) and PCW Today were published specifically for PCW users. In addition to the usual product reviews and technical advice, they featured other content such as articles by science fiction writer and software developer Dave Langford on his experiences of using the PCW.

By 1989,  units had been sold. When the PCW line was retired in 1998, 8 million machines had been sold.  The Daily Telegraph estimated in 2000 that 100,000 were still in use in the UK, and said that the reliability of the PCW's hardware and software and the range of independently produced add-on software for its word processing program were factors in its continued popularity. Laing says the PCW line's downfall was that "proper PCs became affordable". IBM, Compaq and other vendors of more expensive computers had reduced prices drastically in an attempt to increase demand during the recession of the early 1990s. In 1993 the PCW still cost under £390 while a PC system with a printer and word processing software cost over £1,000. However, after adjustment for inflation the retail price of a multimedia IBM-compatible PC in 1997 was about 11% more than that of a PCW 8256 in 1985, and many home PCs were cast-offs, sometimes costing as little as £50, from large organisations that had upgraded their systems.

Users of Windows, Unix or macOS systems who wish to run programs that were developed for the PCW 8256, 8512, 9256, 9512 and 9512+ can use an emulator called "Joyce". There is also another one only for Windows called "CP/M Box".

Models and features

PCW 8256 and 8512

The PCW 8256 was launched in September 1985, and had 256 KB of RAM and one floppy disk drive. Launched a few months later, the PCW 8512 had 512 KB of RAM and two floppy disk drives. Both systems consisted of three units: a printer; a keyboard; and a monochrome CRT monitor whose casing included the processor, memory, motherboard, one or two floppy disk drives, the power supply for all the units and the connectors for the printer and keyboard. The monitor displayed green characters on a black background. It measured  diagonally, and showed 32 lines of 90 characters each. The designers preferred this to the usual personal computer display of 25 80-character lines, as the larger size would be more convenient for displaying a whole letter. The monitor could also display graphics well enough for the bundled graphics program and for some games.

The floppy disk drives on these models were in the unusual 3-inch "compact floppy" format, which was selected as it had a simpler electrical interface than 3½-inch drives. In the range's early days supplies of 3-inch floppies occasionally ran out, but by 1988 the PCW's popularity encouraged suppliers to compete for this market. There are several techniques for transferring data from a PCW to an IBM-compatible PC, some of which also can transfer in the opposite direction, and service companies that will do the job for a fee.
While all the 3-inch disks were double-sided, the PCW 8256's 3-inch drive and the PCW 8512's upper one were single-sided, while the 8512's lower one was double-sided and double-density. Hence there were two types of disk: single-density, which could store 180 KB of data per side, equivalent to about 70 pages of text each; and double density, which could store twice as much per side. The double-density drive could read single-density disks, but it was inadvisable to write to them using this drive. Users of single-sided drives had to flip the disks over to use the full capacity.

The dot matrix printer had a sheet feed for short documents and a tractor attachment for long reports on continuous stationery.  This unit could print 90 characters per second at draft quality and 20 characters per second at higher quality, and could also produce graphics. However it had only 9 printing pins and even its higher quality did not match that of 24-pin printers. The dot matrix printer was not very robust as its chassis was made entirely of plastic. Users who needed to support higher print volumes or to produce graphics could buy a daisy-wheel printer or graph plotter from Amstrad. The daisy-wheel printer could not produce graphics.

The keyboard had 82 keys, some of which were designed for word processing, especially with the bundled Locoscript software – for example to cut, copy, and paste. Other special key combinations activated caps lock, num lock and reboot.

A wide range of upgrades became available. The PCW 8256's RAM could be expanded to 512 KB for a hardware cost of about £50. An additional internal floppy disk drive for the 8256 would cost about £100, and installation was fairly easy. Alternatively one could add external drives, for example if a 3½-inch drive was needed. Graphical user interface devices such as light pens, mice and graphic tablets could be attached to the expansion socket at the back of the monitor. Adding a serial interface connector, which cost about £50, made it possible to attach a modem or non-Amstrad printer.

The designs were licensed to the German consumer electronics company Schneider, which slightly modified their appearance and consequently sold them as "Joyce" and "Joyce Plus". The partnership between Amstrad and Schneider had been formed to market the Amstrad CPC range of computers, and broke up when Amstrad launched the PCW9512.

PCW 9512 and 9256

The PCW 9512, introduced in 1987 at a price of £499 plus VAT, had a white-on-black screen instead of green-on-black, and the bundled printer was a daisy-wheel model instead of a dot-matrix printer. These models also had a parallel port, allowing non-Amstrad printers to be attached. The 9512 was also supplied with version 2 of the Locoscript word processor program  which included spellchecker and mail merge facilities. In all other respects the 9512's facilities were the same as the 8512's.

In 1991 the 9512 was replaced by the PCW 9256 and 9512+, both equipped with a single 3½-inch disk drive that could access 720 KB. The 9512+ had 512 KB of RAM, and two printer options, the Amstrad daisy-wheel unit and a series of considerably more expensive Canon inkjet printers: initially the BJ10e, later the BJ10ex and finally the BJ10sx. The 9256 had 256 KB of RAM and the same dot matrix printer as the 8256 and 8512, as well as the older Locoscript version 1.

PCW 10
This was a PCW 9256 with 512 KB of RAM, a parallel printer port, and Locoscript 1.5 instead of Locoscript 1. The PCW 10 was not a success, and few were produced. By this time other systems offered much better print quality, and the PCW was a poor choice as a general-purpose computer, because of its slow CPU and incompatibility with MS-DOS systems.

PcW16

This model, whose display labelled it "PcW16", was introduced in 1995 at a price of £299. Despite its name it was totally incompatible with all previous PCW systems. Instead of having two operating environments, Locoscript for word processing and CP/M for other uses, it had its own GUI operating system, known as "Rosanne". This could only run one application at a time, and starting another application made the previous one save all the files it had changed and then close. The bundled word processor was produced by Creative Technology, and could read Locoscript files but saved them in its own format. The package also included a spreadsheet, address book, diary, calculator and file manager. Amstrad never provided other applications, and very little third-party software was written for the machine.

The display unit, which also contained the processor, motherboard and RAM, was the standard 640×480 pixels in size and worked in VGA mode. The PcW16 included a standard 1.4 MB floppy drive. While competitors included hard disk drives with capacities of a few hundred MB to a few GB, the PcW16 used a 1 MB flash memory to store the programs and user files. Like previous PCW models, the PcW16 used the 8-bit Zilog Z80 CPU, which first appeared in 1976, while other personal computers used 16-bit CPUs or the more recent 32-bit CPUs. The price included a mouse for use with the GUI, but did not include a printer.

In the magazine PCW Plus Dave Langford expressed a series of concerns about the PcW16: the operating system could not run the many CP/M programs available for previous PCW models; the flash RAM was too small for a large collection of programs, but programs could not be run from the floppy disk, which was designed for backing up files; and a second-hand IBM PC with Locoscript Pro looked like a more sensible upgrade path for users of earlier PCWs. Few PcW16s were sold.

Software
This section covers the PCW 8xxx, 9xxx and 10 series; software for the PcW16 is described above.

Bundled

Locoscript word processor

The word processing software Locoscript was included in the price of the hardware. The manual provided both a reference and a tutorial that could enable users to start work within 20 minutes, and some users found the tutorial provided as much information as they ever needed.

The program enabled users to divide documents into groups, display the groups on a disk and then the documents in the selected group, and set up a template for each group. The "limbo file" facility enabled users to recover accidentally deleted documents until the disk ran out of space, when the software would permanently delete files to make room for new ones.

Layout facilities included setting and using tab stops, production of page headers and footers, with automated page numbering; typographical effects including proportional spacing, a range of font sizes, and bold, italic and underline effects. The cut, copy and paste facility provided 10 paste buffers, each designated by a number, and these could be saved to a disk. The menu system had two layouts, one for beginners and the other for experienced users.

Locoscript supported 150 characters and, if used with the dot matrix printer, could print European letters including Greek and Cyrillic, as well as mathematical and technical symbols. The program allowed the user to work on one document while printing another, so that the relative slowness of the basic printer seldom caused difficulties. Locoscript did not run under the control of a standard operating system but booted directly from a floppy disk. Users had to reboot if they wanted to switch between Locoscript and a CP/M application, unless they used a utility called "Flipper", which could allocate separate areas of  RAM to Locoscript and CP/M.

Locoscript version 1, which was bundled with the PCW 8256 and 8512, had no spell checker or mail merge facilities. Version 2, which was bundled with the PCW 9512, included a spellchecker and could provide mail merge by interfacing to other products from Locomotive Software, such as LocoMail and LocoFile. Locoscript 2 also expanded the character set to 400.

CP/M operating system and applications
The PCW included a version of CP/M known as "CP/M Plus". This provided a range of facilities comparable to those of MS-DOS, but imposed a significant limitation: it could not address more than 64 KB of RAM. Since CP/M took 3 KB of this, the most that CP/M applications could use was 61 KB. The rest of the RAM was used as a RAM disk (exposed under the drive letter "M:" for "memory"), which was much faster than a floppy disk but lost all its data when the machine was powered off. On the other hand, the standalone Locoscript word processor program was able to use 154 KB as normal memory, and the rest as a RAM disk.

Mallard BASIC, like  LocoScript, was a Locomotive Software product, but ran under CP/M. This version of BASIC lacked built-in graphics facilities, but included JetSAM, an implementation of ISAM that supported multiple indexes per file, so that programs could access records directly by specifying values of key fields. The CP/M software bundle also included the Digital Research implementation of Seymour Papert's LOGO programming language and a graphics program that could produce pie charts and bar charts.

Sold separately
Many software vendors supplied versions of their products to run with CP/M Plus, making a wide range of software available for the PCW, often very cheaply:
Alternative word processors included Superwriter and WordStar.
Several spreadsheet programs became available, including SuperCalc II and Microsoft's Multiplan.
Database programs adapted for the PCW included Sage Database, Cardbox and dBase II.
The MicroDesign, Desk Top Publisher, Newsdesk and Stop Press desktop publishing packages were used by groups of authors for newsletters.
The Sage Group's Popular Accounts and Payroll, and the Camsoft payroll and accounting software.
Other programming languages, including C.
Many games for the PCW. Most were text adventures but there were also graphical games like Batman, Bounder and Head over Heels.

Free software
Many free packages could run under CP/M but required careful setting of options to run on the PCW series, although a significant number had installer programs that made this task easier. Programs that were already configured for the PCW covered a broad range of requirements including word processors, databases, graphics, personal accounts, programming languages, games, utilities and a full-featured bulletin board system. Many of these were at least as good as similar commercial offerings, but most had poor documentation.

Technical design
All PCW models, including the PcW16, used the Zilog Z80 range of CPUs. A 4 MHz Z80A was used in the 8256, 8512, 9512, 9256, 9512+ and PCW10; and a 16 MHz Z80 in the PCW16.

The Z80 could only access 64 KB of RAM at a time. Software could work around this by bank switching, accessing different banks of memory at different times but this made programming more complex and slowed the system down. The PCW divided the Z80 memory map into four 16 KB banks. In CP/M, the memory used for the display was switched out while programs were running, giving more than 60 KB of usable RAM. While the Joyce architecture was designed with configurations of 128 KB and 256 KB of RAM in mind, no PCW was ever sold with 128 KB of RAM.

Each PCW's CP/M application could not use more than 64 KB so the system used the rest of the RAM for a RAM drive. On the other hand, the standalone Locoscript word processor program was reported as using up to 154 KB as normal memory and the rest as a RAM disk.

Unusually, the Z80 CPU in the PCW 8256, 8512, 9512, 9256 and 9512+ had no directly connected ROM, which most computers used to start the boot process. Instead, at startup, the ASIC (customised circuit) at the heart of the PCW provided access to part of the 1k ROM  within the Intel 8041 microcontroller used to drive the printer. The Z80 would copy 256 bytes via the ASIC into RAM, providing sufficient instructions to load the first sector from a floppy. The ROM-based code cannot display text, being too small to support character generation; instead, it displays a bright screen which is progressively filled by black stripes as the code is loaded from the floppy.

To make the printer cheap enough to be included with every PCW, Amstrad placed the majority of its drive electronics inside the PCW cabinet.  The printer case contained only  electromechanical components and high-current driver electronics; its power was supplied via a coaxial power connector socket on the monitor casing, and rather than using a traditional parallel interface, pin and motor signals were connected directly by a 34-wire ribbon cable to an 8041 microcontroller on the PCW's mainboard.

Most models of PCW were bundled with a 9-pin dot matrix printer mechanism, with the later 9512 and 9512+ models using a daisywheel (with a different cable; the printers were not interchangeable with the dot matrix models).  These PCW printers could not, of course, be used on other computers, and the original PCW lacked a then-standard Centronics printer port.  Instead, the Z80 bus and video signals were brought to an edge connector socket at the back of the cabinet.  Many accessories including parallel and serial ports were produced for this interface. Some of the later models included a built-in parallel port; these could be bundled with either the dedicated Amstrad printer or a Canon Bubblejet model.

The PCWs were not designed to play video games, although some software authors considered this a minor detail, releasing games like Batman, Head Over Heels, and Bounder.  The PCW video system was not at all suited to games.  In order that it be able to display a full 80-column page plus margins, the display's addressable area was 90 columns and the display had 32 lines.  The display was monochrome and bitmapped with a resolution of 720 by 256 pixels.  At 1 bit per pixel, this occupied 23 KB of RAM which was far too large for the Z80 CPU to scroll in software without ripple and tearing of the display.  Instead, the PCW implemented a Roller RAM consisting of a 512-byte area of RAM that held the address of each line of display data. The screen could now be scrolled either by changing the Roller RAM contents or by writing to an I/O port that set the starting point in Roller RAM for the screen data. This allowed for very rapid scrolling. The video system also fetched data in a special order designed so that plotting a character eight scan lines high would touch eight contiguous addresses.  This meant that the Z80's concise block copy instructions, such as LDIR, could be used.  Unfortunately, it also meant that drawing lines and other shapes could be very complicated.

The PcW16 does not share any hardware with the original PCW series, other than the Z80 CPU, and should be considered to be a completely different machine.

See also
 Amstrad CP/M Plus character set
 Amstrad CPC
 SymbOS
 List of Amstrad PCW games
 IBM Displaywriter System

References

External links

 Amstrad PCW 16 page at www.old-computers.com
 Amstrad PCW 8256/8512 at www.old-computers.com
 PCW Joyce Computer Club
 Screen shots of the PcW16's Rosanne GUI
 PCW nostalgia. BBC Web page.
 PCW Emulator CP/M Box

Computer-related introductions in 1985
Z80-based home computers
Personal computers
Computers designed in the United Kingdom
Amstrad